Events from the year 1732 in Russia

Incumbents
 Monarch – Anna

Events

  Treaty of the Three Black Eagles
 Treaty of Resht

Births

Deaths

 
 
 
 Agrippina Petrovna Volkonskaia

References

1732 in Russia
Years of the 18th century in the Russian Empire